Lublin Voivodeship was an administrative region of the Kingdom of Poland created in 1474 out of three eastern counties of Sandomierz Voivodeship and lasting until the Partitions of Poland in 1795. Together with Sandomierz Voivodeship and Kraków Voivodeship, it was part of historic Lesser Poland (see Lesser Poland Province of the Polish Crown). Lublin Voivodeship had two senators in the Senate of the Kingdom of Poland: the Voivode and the Castellan of Lublin. Local sejmiks took place in Lublin.

The entire area of the voivodeship was located east of the Vistula river, and its boundaries did not change from the time of its creation (1474), until its dissolution by Austrian authorities in 1795, after the third and final partition of Poland. After 1795, the entire Lublin Voivodeship became part of Austrian province of West Galicia. In 1809, former Lublin Voivodeship was annexed by the Duchy of Warsaw (since 1815 – Russian-controlled Congress Kingdom). Among major towns of contemporary Poland, which belonged to the voivodeship are Biłgoraj, Kraśnik, Lubartów, Leczna, Opole Lubelskie, Łuków, Parczew, Puławy, Radzyń Podlaski, Siedlce, and Świdnik.

Zygmunt Gloger in his book Historical Geography of the Lands of Old Poland gives a detailed description of Lublin Voivodeship together with the Land of Łuków:

"The fact that the area between the Vistula and the Bug River belonged to Poland during the reign of Bolesław Chrobry, is confirmed by chronicles from the times of the Piast dynasty. Jan Długosz writes that the Land of Lublin was densely inhabited by farmers and other settlers, but its population was decimated in 1244, during a raid carried out by the Lithuanians, the Old Prussians, and the Yotvingians, after which it turned into a desert (...)

First castellans of Lublin were mentioned in 1230. They resided in a defensive castle, and this land was part of the Duchy of Sandomierz (...) King Casimir IV Jagiellon, aware of the fact that Sandomierz Voivodeship was too large, separated parts of it located behind the Vistula and the San, creating Lublin Voivodeship. This was confirmed by the Sejm in Piotrków Trybunalski in 1474. First voivode of Lublin was Dobieslaw Kmita of Wiśnicz (...)

Total area of the voivodeship was 200 sq. miles, out of which Lublin County took 105 sq. miles, Urzedow County approximately 60 sq. miles, and the Land of Łuków – 35 sq. miles. In the 16th century, it had 34 towns, 663 villages and 82 Roman Catholic parishes (...) The voivodeship had two senators, which were the Voivode and the Castellan of Lublin. The sejmiks took place in Lublin, where six deputies were elected to the Sejm of the Polish–Lithuanian Commonwealth, and two deputies to the Lesser Poland Tribunal. Local pospolite ruszenie met near Lublin, and the voivodeship several starostwos, located in Lublin, Łuków, Urzedow, Parczew, Kazimierz Dolny, Wawolnica, Kakolewnica, Zbuczyn and others (...)

Of the three parts of Lesser Poland proper, Lublin Voivodeship was conveniently located by three navigable rivers – the Vistula, the San, and the Wieprz. It also had fertile soil, and a number of historical monuments".

Voivodeship Governor (Wojewoda) seat:
 Lublin

Administrative division:
 Lublin County (Powiat Lubelski), Lublin
 Urzędów County (Powiat Urzędowski), Urzędów
 Łuków County (Powiat Łukowski, also called the Land of Łuków), Łuków

Main Lublin Voivodes:
 Jan Feliks "Szram" Tarnowski (before 1494)
 Piotr Firlej, 1537–1545
 Jan Tarło (1527–1587) (from 1574)
 Marek Sobieski (from 1597)
 Aleksander Piotr Tarło (1631–1649)
 Marcin Zamoyski (from 1682)
 Jan Tarło (1684–1750) (from 1719)
 Tomasz Antoni Zamoyski (from 1744)
 Antoni Lubomirski (from 1778)

Neighboring voivodeships:
 Masovian Voivodeship
 Brest Litovsk Voivodeship
 Chełm Voivodeship
 Bełz Voivodeship
 Ruthenian Voivodeship
 Sandomierz Voivodeship

References

Sources 
 Lublin Voivodeship with Łuków Land by Zygmunt Gloger
Central European Superpower, Henryk Litwin, BUM Magazine, October 2016.

Voivodeships of the Polish–Lithuanian Commonwealth
History of Lesser Poland
 
1474 establishments in Europe
15th-century establishments in Poland
1795 disestablishments in the Polish–Lithuanian Commonwealth